Montemor may refer to the following places in Portugal:

 Montemor-o-Novo, a municipality in the district of Évora
 Montemor-o-Velho, a municipality in the district of Coimbra

See also
 Monte Mor, municipality in the state of São Paulo, Brazil